Posankka is a statue located in Turku, Finland. The statue, which is located near the campus area of the University of Turku and the Turku Student Village, represents a hybrid between a marzipan pig ("possu") and a rubber duck ("ankka"). It is a pink animal with a duck's lower body and a pig's head.

The statue was designed by Alvar Gullichsen in 1999 when it was placed floating in the Aurajoki river in Turku. The statue has stood at its current location since 2001.

Every winter, a Santa Claus hat is put on Posankkas head,  and on Walpurgis Night it is capped with a Finnish student cap.

References

Further reading 
 
  (history of Posankka with some pictures)

Statues and sculptures in Turku
1999 sculptures
Animal sculptures